Arctolamia luteomaculata is a species of beetle in the family Cerambycidae. It was described by Pu in 1981. It is known from China and Thailand.

References

Lamiini
Beetles described in 1981